Ultimate Note is a 2020 Chinese streaming television series that premiered on iQiyi on December 10, 2020, which tells a story of Wu Xie's adventures after Genting Temple when he received two videos from Zhang Qiling. 
It is directed by Zou Xi and Wei Lizhou, and features an ensemble cast that includes Joseph Zeng, Xiao Yuliang, Hankiz Omar, Liu Yuning and Cheng Fangxu. The series was adapted from Nan Pai San Su's novel, Daomu Biji.

Cast 

 Joseph Zeng as Wu Xie
 Xiao Yuliang as Zhang Qiling
 Hankiz Omar as A Ning
 Liu Yuning as Hei Yanjing
 Cheng Fangxu as Wang Pangzi
 Fan Ming as Wu Sanxing
 Wang Jinsong as Wu Erbai
 Leanne Liu as Huo Xiangu
 Liu Yuhan as Xie Yuchen
 Liu Ruoyan as Huo Xiuxiu
 Wan Peixin as Pan Zi

References 

Adventure television series
2020 Chinese television series debuts